Geoffrey Robert Davies (born 22 July 1946) is a former Australian cricketer. He played 73 first-class matches for New South Wales between 1965/66 and 1971/72. He toured New Zealand with the Australian team in 1966-67 and 1969-70, and was once 12th man for the Australian Test team.

Davies was a middle-order batsman and leg-spin bowler. When he was chosen to tour New Zealand in 1967 The Canberra Times said he was "destined to become a permanent member of the Australian side – if he retains his promise". He played as the professional for East Lancashire in the Lancashire League in 1967 and was one of the league's leading players, scoring 695 runs at an average of 48.98 and taking 40 wickets at 15.97. He scored 112 and took 6 for 43 in the second innings in New South Wales' victory over Queensland in 1967-68. He was considered a contender for the 1968 tour of England, but was not selected.

See also
 List of New South Wales representative cricketers

References

External links
 

1946 births
Living people
Australian cricketers
New South Wales cricketers
Cricketers from Sydney